Helmond Brouwhuis is a railway station in Brouwhuis, a housing area of Helmond, Netherlands. The station opened in 1987 and is on the Venlo–Eindhoven railway. The station has 2 platforms. Train services are operated by Nederlandse Spoorwegen.

Train service
The following services calls at Helmond Brouwhuis:
2x per hour local services (stoptrein) 's-Hertogenbosch - Eindhoven - Deurne

External links
NS website 
Dutch Public Transport journey planner 

Brouwhuis
Railway stations opened in 1987
Railway stations on the Staatslijn E